Empress Xiaoshurui (孝淑睿皇后), of the Manchu Plain White Banner Hitara clan (喜塔臘氏) was a posthumous name bestowed to the wife and first empress consort of Yongyan, the Jiaqing Emperor. She was empress consort of Qing from 1796 until her death in 1797, having been empress for barely a year.

Life

Family background
Empress Xiaoshurui's personal name was not recorded in history.

 Father: He'erjing'e, served as a second rank literary official in the Imperial Household Department and a second rank military official, and held the title of a third class duke
 Paternal grandfather: Chang'an
 Paternal grandmother: Lady Ligiya
 Mother: Lady Wanggiya
 One elder brother and one younger brother

Qianlong era
The future Empress Xiaoshurui was born on the 24th day of the eighth lunar month in the 25th year of the reign of the Qianlong Emperor, which translates to 2 October 1760 in the Gregorian calendar.

On 5 June 1774, Lady Hitara married Yongyan, the 15th son of the Qianlong Emperor, and became his primary consort. She gave birth on 2 June 1780 to his second daughter, who would die prematurely on 6 September 1783, on 16 September 1782 to his second son, Minning, and on 20 October 1784 to his fourth daughter, Princess Zhuangjing of the First Rank. According to Qing dynasty imperial medical records, Empress Xiaoshurui was of good health.

Jiaqing era
On 9 February 1796, the Qianlong Emperor abdicated in favour of Yongyan and became a Retired Emperor, while Yongyan was enthroned as the Jiaqing Emperor. On 12 February 1796, Lady Hitara, as the emperor's primary consort, was instated as empress consort. The Empress died of illness on 5 March 1797, having been empress for barely a year.

Daoguang era
The Jiaqing Emperor died on 2 September 1820 and was succeeded by Minning, who was enthroned as the Daoguang Emperor. In April or May 1821, he honoured his mother with the posthumous title "Empress Xiaoshurui".

Titles
 During the reign of the Qianlong Emperor (r. 1735–1796):
 Lady Hitara (from 2 October 1760)
 Primary consort (from 5 June 1774)
 During the reign of the Jiaqing Emperor (r. 1796–1820):
 Empress (from 12 February 1796)
 Empress Xiaoshu (from May/June 1797)
 During the reign of the Daoguang Emperor (r. 1820–1850):
 Empress Xiaoshurui (from April/May 1821)

Issue
 As primary consort:
 The Jiaqing Emperor's second daughter (2 June 1780 – 6 September 1783)
 Minning (16 September 1782 – 26 February 1850), the Jiaqing Emperor's second son, enthroned on 3 October 1820 as the Daoguang Emperor
 Princess Zhuangjing of the First Rank (20 October 1784 – 27 June 1811), the Jiaqing Emperor's fourth daughter
 Married Manibadala (d. 1832) of the Tumed Borjigit clan in November/December 1802
 Miscarriage at three months (18 August 1785)

In fiction and popular culture
 Portrayed by Yuen Yi-ling in The Rise and Fall of Qing Dynasty (1988)
 Portrayed by Natalie Wong in Wars of In-laws (2005)
 Portrayed by Sarah Song in Curse of the Royal Harem (2011)
 Portrayed by Jess Sum in Succession War (2018)

See also
 Ranks of imperial consorts in China#Qing
 Royal and noble ranks of the Qing dynasty

Notes

References
 

1760 births
1797 deaths
Xiaoshurui, Empress
Xiaoshurui, Empress
Xiaoshurui, Empress
18th-century Chinese women
18th-century Chinese people